China 3 is a variety of lychee fruit, belonging to the family Sapindaceae and tribe Nepheleae. This variety is one of the best grown in Bengal region in the eastern part of the Indian subcontinent. The trees are only about 5 to 6 m tall with relatively smaller leaves. Bearing is regular if proper management and care is taken, otherwise they show an irregular bearing habit. China-3 was found to perform satisfactorily in other areas, except where rain starts earlier.

It is a late variety and fruits ripen in the last week of June. The average yield is 124 kg per tree. The round fruit is bigger with attractive red, orange skin colour. The pulp is creamy white, soft and juicy.

Description

China 3 is a variety of lychee fruit. This is a late variety and fruits ripen in the last week of June. The average yield of 124 kg per each tree. However, on a regular basis does not bear fruit. The fruit size of china-3 is bigger with attractive skin colour. Fruits are globose, with a composition of red, orange and patches of green colour. Average common weight of fruit is 25 g. Pulp is creamy white, soft and succulent. TSS 18 percent, seed small, pulp-seed ratio 15:1.

Cultivation 
The planting of China-3 lychee is generally done during June–July, i.e. during the rainy season, but the best planting time is April–June when the weather is humid but not too wet or too dry. Planting may also be done after the rainy season, i.e. August–September, but regular irrigation is required for better establishment of the orchard. In old orchards lychee trees were planted 10–12 m apart both ways, i.e. in rows and between plants in rows. The spacing of 10 m is found to be adequate in areas where the soil is deep loam and fertile and when necessary care is taken during the initial stage of cultivation. In other areas 7–8 m distance was found to be sufficient. At present high density plantation has also started. In the case of high density planting the spacing is 4 m x 4 m.

Harvest 
Fruit quality of china-3 is the best among the available land races, the vast majority of which are harsh in taste with low pulp:stone proportion. The recently released BARI Lichu-3 resembles China-3 in size, shape, quality and taste, but is yet to be distributed to the farmers. The yield of china-3 lychee in Bangladesh, Eastern India and Northeastern India are growing, however, the average yield of lychee is far less and it can be increased substantially.

Gallery

References

External links 
 Lychee production - Food and Agriculture Organization

Chinese fruit
Food plant cultivars
Sapindaceae
Trees of Bangladesh
Trees of China
Tropical fruit